The 2019–20 season was Tirana's 3rd consecutive season in the Kategoria Superiore. The club was participated in the Kategoria Superiore and the Albanian Cup.

Competitions

Kategoria Superiore

League table

Results summary

Results by round

August

September

October

November

December

Albanian Cup

First round

Second round

Quarter-finals

Semi-finals

Final

Squad statistics

Appearances (Apps.) numbers are for appearances in competitive games only including sub appearances

Notes

References

 

2019-20
Tirana
Albanian football championship-winning seasons